The Israeli Noar Premier League (Ligat Ha'al LeNoar, lit. Youth Super League) is the top division in the Israeli football league system for teenagers between the ages 18–20. From 1994 to 2011, it was called Israeli Noar Leumit League. The league is a continuation of the previous youth league system, established in 1941.

History
A youth football league was established during the British mandate in 1941, and was played for three seasons. The league resumed for the 1947–48 season, during which the state of Israel was established, and the league was partly finished afterwards.

Following the establishment of Israel, the league was reorganized, and was divided into regional divisions, with the champions of each division playing a championship play-off to determine the nationwide champions. In 1982, the IFA decided to form a nationwide division, at the top of the league system, called Liga Leumit (similar to the seniors' top division). In 1994, the IFA re-established the league as the Liga Illit  (lit. Super League).

Number of foreigners
Teams are limited to two foreign players per team. Special circumstances such as Druze players from the Golan with no citizenship, such as Weaam Amasha. Another case includes that of Toto Tamuz, who did not have full Israeli citizenship, do not count against the foreign player limit.

Current Noar Premier League clubs

 Beitar Jerusalem
 Beitar Nes Tubruk
 Bnei Sakhnin
 F.C. Ashdod
 Hapoel Be'er Sheva
 Hapoel Hadera
 Hapoel Nir Ramat HaSharon
 Hapoel Nof HaGalil
 Hapoel Ra'anana 
 Hapoel Ramat Gan Givatayim
 Hapoel Rishon LeZion
 Hapoel Tel Aviv
 Ironi Nesher
 Ironi Kiryat Shmona
 Maccabi Haifa
 Maccabi Netanya
 Maccabi Petah Tikva
 Maccabi Tel Aviv

Champions

1 No playoff was played.

Total championships (from 1994)

References
 100 Years of Football 1906–2006, Elisha Shohat (Israel), 2006, pp. 350–351

External links
Israel Football Association

 

 
Football leagues in Israel
Youth football in Israel
Israel